Marcus LaJuan Pollard (born February 8, 1972) is a former American football tight end and current director of player development and youth football for the Jacksonville Jaguars.

College career
Born in Lanett, Alabama, Pollard attended Valley High School of Valley, Alabama and  Bradley University of Peoria, Illinois, where he played basketball.  Bradley did not have a football program at the time he matriculated there.  He played basketball as a power forward – two years starting at Seward County Community College in Liberal, Kansas, before transferring to Bradley, where he also started two years, averaging 7.3 points per game and 5 rebounds, while shooting .497 from the field.  In 1993, he helped the team reach the third round of the National Invitational Tournament.

Professional career
Despite the fact he never played college football, Pollard was signed by the Indianapolis Colts as an undrafted free agent in 1995. He developed into one of the better pass-catching tight ends while with the Colts.  His best season was 2001, when he totaled 47 receptions and 8 touchdowns, including one for 86 yards. On November 11, 2004, Pollard caught two touchdown passes to help the Colts to a 31-28 victory over the Minnesota Vikings. After the emergence of fellow tight end Dallas Clark in Indianapolis left Pollard expendable, Pollard joined the Detroit Lions for two seasons. Pollard was also a member of the Seattle Seahawks, New England Patriots and Atlanta Falcons.

NFL career statistics

Front office career
In 2013, Pollard was hired by the Jacksonville Jaguars as their Director of Player Development.

Personal life
Pollard and his wife, Amani, were cast members of the reality television show The Amazing Race 19. They finished the competition in third place out of the 11 teams. They have four children together.

References

External links
 Atlanta Falcons bio
 Detroit Lions bio
 New England Patriots bio

1972 births
Living people
American football tight ends
Atlanta Falcons players
Basketball players from Alabama
American men's basketball players
Bradley Braves men's basketball players
Detroit Lions players
Indianapolis Colts players
Jacksonville Jaguars executives
Junior college men's basketball players in the United States
New England Patriots players
People from Valley, Alabama
Seattle Seahawks players
The Amazing Race (American TV series) contestants
People from Lanett, Alabama